Unnatural Acts can refer to

 Unnatural act, a form of sexual behavior that is considered a punishable offense by law
 Unnatural Acts (radio series), a BBC radio comedy series 
 Unnatural Acts (TV series), a 1998 television sketch comedy series
  Unnatural Acts of Intercourse, a working title of the Stephen King book Just After Sunset